Stringfellow is a surname. Notable people with the surname include:

 Benjamin Franklin Stringfellow (1816-1891), American Attorney general and businessman
 Benjamin Franklin Stringfellow (1840-1913), Confederate spy
 Clinton Stringfellow (1905–1959), New Zealand rugby union player
 Douglas R. Stringfellow, American politician
 Ian Stringfellow, English footballer
 James Stringfellow, one-time owner of the Stringfellow Acid Pits
 Joe Stringfellow (1918–1992), American football player
 John Stringfellow (1799–1883), English designer and flight pioneer
 Ken Stringfellow, American musician
 Mike Stringfellow, English-born footballer who played for Leicester in the 1960s and 1970s
 Olga Stringfellow, novelist
 Peter Stringfellow, English nightclub owner
 Peter Stringfellow (footballer), English footballer
 Savanté Stringfellow, American athlete
 Thomas Stringfellow, singer-songwriter
 Thornton Stringfellow, US Baptist clergyman, defender of slavery
 William Stringfellow (1928-1985), American theologian

See also
Stringfellow (disambiguation)

English-language surnames
Surnames of English origin